La Muela is a municipality located in the Valdejalón comarca, province of Zaragoza, Aragon, Spain. According to the INE, La Muela had a population of 5,894 in 2020, increased from 5,479 in 2018 and from 4,928 in 2009.

It is the location of a wind farm that provides power to the city of Zaragoza and the surrounding area.

References

Municipalities in the Province of Zaragoza